Richard James Bartlett (born 8 October 1966) is a former English cricketer who played 51 first-class and 60 one day matches for Somerset between 1985 and 1992. A right-hand bat and occasional right-arm off break bowler, Bartlett scored 1,856 first-class runs at 24.42 with two centuries, and 1,251 one day runs at 21.94 and a best of 85. He also took four wickets at 36.25.

In July 2007, Bartlett completed a charity golf challenge in which he played a round at every course in New Zealand over the period of a year.

Notes

External links
 

1966 births
English cricketers
Somerset cricketers
Marylebone Cricket Club cricketers
Cornwall cricketers
Sportspeople from Taunton
Living people